Almirón is a Spanish surname. Notable people with the surname include:

Miguel Almiron (born 1993), Paraguayan footballer
Rodolfo Almirón (1935-2009), Argentine Argentine Anticommunist Alliance leader
Sergio Bernardo Almirón (born 1980), Argentine footballer
Sergio Omar Almirón (born 1958), Argentine footballer, 1986 FIFA World Cup winner

Spanish-language surnames